Songpa-dong is a neighbourhood, dong of Songpa-gu, Seoul, South Korea. There are three assumptions on the etymology of the name. One is that it may come from "Songpa Naruteo" (송파나루터 Songpa ferry)

Education
Schools located in Songpa-dong:
 Joongdae Elementary School
 Songpa Elementary School
 Garak Middle School
 Ilsin Girls' Middle School
 Garak High School
 Jamsil Girls' High School
 Ilshin Girls' Commercial High School

Transportation 
 Seokchon station of 
 Songpa station of

See also
Administrative divisions of South Korea

References

External links
  Songpa 1-dong resident center website
 Songpa-gu map

Neighbourhoods of Songpa District